Juan Heredia is the name of:

Juan Carlos Heredia (born 1952), Argentine-Spanish footballer
Juan Francisco Heredia (born 1989), Spanish footballer
Juan Heredia Moreno (1942–2018), Spanish footballer